Bajorek is a Polish surname. Notable people with the surname include:
Christopher H. Bajorek (born 1943), American engineer
Franciszek Bajorek (1908–1987), Polish activist, lawyer, and politician
Anna Streżyńska (born Anna Maria Bajorek; 1967), Polish lawyer and politician

Polish-language surnames